Nicardipine (Cardene) is a medication used to treat high blood pressure and angina. It belongs to the dihydropyridine class of calcium channel blockers (CCBs). It is also used for Raynaud's phenomenon. It is available in by mouth and intravenous formulations. It has been used in percutaneous coronary intervention. 

Its mechanism of action and clinical effects closely resemble those of nifedipine and the other dihydropyridine calcium channel blockers (amlodipine, felodipine), except that nicardipine is more selective for cerebral and coronary blood vessels. It is primarily a peripheral arterial vasodilator, thus unlike the nitrovasodilators (nitroglycerin and nitroprusside), cardiac preload is minimally affected. It has the longest duration among parenteral CCBs.  As its use may lead to reflex tachycardia, it is advisable to use it in conjunction with a beta-blocker.

It was patented in 1973 and approved for medical use in 1981.

Nicardipine was approved by the FDA in December 1988. The patent for both Cardene and Cardene SR expired in October 1995.

See also
Calcium channel blocker toxicity

References

Calcium channel blockers
CYP2D6 inhibitors
Dihydropyridines
Nitrobenzenes
Hoffmann-La Roche brands
Carboxylate esters
Amines
Glycine receptor agonists
Glycine receptor antagonists
GABAA receptor negative allosteric modulators
Methyl esters